XEQ-AM (940 kHz) is a commercial class A clear channel AM radio station in Mexico City. The concession is held by Cadena Radiodifusora Mexicana, S.A. de C.V. and is operated by Radiópolis. XEQ-AM broadcasts from a transmitter located at Los Reyes Acaquilpan, on Boulevard Generalísimo Morelos, east of Mexico City. It currently simulcasts XEQ-FM 92.9.

History
XEQ began operations in 1938. It was owned by Emilio Azcárraga Vidaurreta doing business as Radio Panamericana, S.A., and was a network affiliate of CBS Radio as part of the "Chain of the Americas." It was Azcárraga's second station after XEW-AM. By the 1960s, XEQ was operating with 150,000 watts during the day and 50,000 at night. In the 1970s, it switched to 100,000 watts day and night. It later reduced its power to 50,000 watts.

The XEQ call sign later appeared on other stations: XEQ-FM was licensed in the 1950s, and the original XEQ-TV, broadcasting to Puebla, signed on in 1952 to relay XEW-TV. (In 1985, a call sign swap led to a different XEQ-TV in Mexico City.)

In 2014 and 2015, XEQ was approved to lower its power from 50,000 to 30,000 watts.

Until 2019, the station was known as Ke Buena but carried a tropical version of the format, instead of the typical grupera version. On October 31, 2019, this ended and XEQ-AM began simulcasting XEQ-FM.

On November 7, 2022, Monterrey's XHCHL-FM also adopted the Ke Buena format, relaying most of XEQ's programming but with local advertising.

References

1938 establishments in Mexico
Radio stations established in 1938
Radio stations in Mexico City
Radiópolis
Clear-channel radio stations